Kumanovo Clock Tower was a clock tower in Kumanovo, Ottoman Empire (today North Macedonia). The tower is believed to have existed since the second half of the 18th century but there are now known historical facts. It was near Eski Mosque in the former Orta Bunar Neighborhood. It was demolished after the  Second World War.

See also
 Kumanovo
 Buildings in Kumanovo

References

Towers completed in the 18th century
Buildings and structures in Kumanovo
Clock towers
Demolished buildings and structures in North Macedonia